George Henry "Dode" Paskert (August 28, 1881 – February 12, 1959) was an American center fielder in Major League Baseball who played from 1907 through 1921 for the Cincinnati Reds, Philadelphia Phillies, and Chicago Cubs.

Career
Born in Cleveland, Ohio, the speedy Dode Paskert was one of the finest defensive center fielders of the dead-ball era. He was also a patient hitter who worked pitchers deep into the count as well as a notorious pull hitter. Being used most often in the leadoff position, Paskert frequently hit for extra bases.

Paskert collected 51 stolen bases for the Reds in 1910, including stealing second base, third base, and home in the first inning of a 6–5 win over the Boston Bees.

His most productive season in 1912, when he hit a career-high .312 batting average along with a .420 on-base percentage and .413 slugging average, ranking among the top 10 in four offensive categories, and being considered in the National League MVP vote at the end of the season.

From 1912 to 1918 he ranked among the top ten in doubles four times and home runs once.

In between, the reliable Paskert batted third in the lineup in each game of the 1915 World Series for the Phillies against the Boston Red Sox, while batting clean-up for the Cubs in each game of the 1918 World Series, also against the Red Sox.

In a 15-season career, Paskert hit a .268/.350/.361 batting line, including 577 runs batted in, 868 runs scored, 1613 hits, 279 doubles, 77 triples, 42 home runs, and stole 293 bases in 1,716 games. Defensively, he recorded a .968 fielding percentage.

Afterwards, Paskert played in the minor leagues for the Kansas City Blues and Columbus Senators of the American Association and the Atlanta Crackers and Nashville Vols of the Southern Association, before retiring from baseball.

Paskert died in 1959 in Cleveland, Ohio, at the age of 77.

References

External links

, or Retrosheet, or SABR Biography Project
 

1881 births
1959 deaths
Atlanta Crackers players
Baseball players from Cleveland
Chicago Cubs players
Cincinnati Reds players
Columbus Senators players
Dayton Veterans players
Kansas City Blues (baseball) players
Major League Baseball center fielders
Nashville Vols players
Philadelphia Phillies players